Darnell Harris is the name of:

Darnell Harris (basketball, born 1986), American basketball player
Darnell Harris (basketball, born 1992), American basketball player